The Inland Line is a  railway line between Kristinehamn and Gällivare in Sweden. It runs through the central parts of northern Sweden, and was built between 1908 and 1937.

History 
There were several reasons for constructing the railway. The original main line to the north of Sweden ran relatively near the east coast, but inland connections were poor to non-existent; the inland regions, rich in natural resources (mainly timber) needed opening up. However, there was a strategic aspect to be considered; should Sweden be invaded from the east (which at the time was a serious possibility) the belligerents would certainly try to cut the main line to the north as quickly as possible; thus a second reserve route further inland was deemed highly important. In 1907 the Riksdag decided that the first link between Östersund and Ulriksfors was to be built. The next stage Ulriksfors–Volgsjö (today Vilhelmina) was conceived in 1911; the year after that the Sveg-Brunflo stage was given the go ahead. The northernmost stage Vilhelmina–Gällivare was given the go-ahead in 1917. Finally, by purchasing the private railway lines between Sveg and Kristinehamn the entire 1288 km stretch stood clear.

It was to take many years for the navvies to build this line. Originally it was to be inaugurated in 1924, but due to the effects of WW1, the post-war recession and labour shortages it was not finished until 1937, opened on 6 August that year.

The line was thereafter operated by SJ, but never proved profitable, suffering a gradually decreasing service until 1992, when it was mothballed entirely. By this time the far southern section from Mora to Filipstad had already been closed.

The remaining track was subsequently sold off to the municipalities along the route. Today Inlandsbanan AB operates a passenger service for about 3 months each summer and 4 months in winter as for 2022, primarily for tourists. For 2022 the  service consists of one train daily on each section (Östersund-Mora-Östersund and Östersund-Gällivare-Östersund) The Östersund–Gällivare section, a journey of around 14 hours; likewise a single train pair makes the round trip Östersund–Mora–Östersund, taking about 6 hours each way. The line has also been re-opened to freight and sees a considerable amount of traffic, mainly logging traffic. Also for 2013 the line between Kristinehamn and Mora has been refurbished and is once again open throughout, served by one train pair per day for the peak period (for exact times check Inlandbanan's web site); otherwise a coach service is provided along the route. The southernmost , Kristinehamn–Nykroppa, also has a sparse all-seasons passenger service operated by Värmlandstrafik as part of a line from Kristinehamn to Ludvika.

References

External links

Inlandsbanan  - Official site

Railway lines in Sweden
Railway lines opened in 1908
1908 establishments in Sweden